Kally Sambucini (1892–1969) was an Italian film actress, known for playing the female sidekick Za La Vie in the Za La Mort series of action films alongside Emilio Ghione.

Selected filmography
 The Rose of Granada (1916)
 Za La Mort (1924)
 Latest Night News (1924)

References

External links

1892 births
1969 deaths
Italian film actresses
Actresses from Rome